A latke ( latke; sometimes romanized latka, lit. "pancake") is a type of potato pancake or fritter in Ashkenazi Jewish cuisine that is traditionally prepared to celebrate Hanukkah. Latkes can be made with ingredients other than potatoes such as cheese, onion, and zucchini.

Etymology
The word comes from the Yiddish , itself from the East Slavic , a diminutive of  'small fried pancake', which in turn is from Hellenistic Greek ἐλάδιον eládion, '(olive) oil', diminutive of Ancient Greek ἔλαιον élaion, 'oil'.

Its Modern Hebrew name,  ( levivá), plural levivot, is a revival of a word used in the Book of Samuel to describe a dumpling made from kneaded dough, part of the story of Amnon and Tamar. Some interpreters have noted that the homonym  ( leváv) means "heart", and the verbal form of l-v-v ( l-b-b) occurs in the Song of Songs as well. In the lexicon of Ashkenazi Jews from Udmurtia and Tatarstan, there are recorded versions of the kosher-style appellation of latkes during the eight-day Hanukkah holiday.

History
Some version of latkes goes back to at least the Middle Ages. They were probably made of cheese (probably either ricotta or curd cheese), fried in poppyseed oil or butter, and served with fruit preserves. These cheese latkes were the most common kind of latke in Ashkenazi communities until the 19th century when the potato arrived in eastern Europe. At the time, the cheapest and most readily available cooking fat was schmaltz, rendered poultry fat (usually from a goose or chicken), and due to Jewish dietary laws, which prohibit the mixing of meat and dairy products, alternatives to the cheese latke were introduced. These included buckwheat, rye flour, or other tubers endemic to the region, such as turnips. As the potato became popular in eastern Europe, it was quickly adopted to the point that today, latke is almost synonymous with potatoes.

The latke is traditionally prepared during the Hanukkah holiday to commemorate the miracle of the oil in the Jewish Temple in Jerusalem lasting eight days.

Variations

Latkes today are most commonly made with potatoes, although other vegetables are also sometimes used. There are two main varieties: those made with grated potato and those made with puréed or mashed potato. The textures of these two varieties are different.

Grated potato version
Latkes made of grated potatoes are popular. They are prepared by grating potatoes and onions with a box grater or food processor; then, excess moisture is squeezed out. The grated potatoes are then mixed with eggs and flour or matzo meal; a vegan version uses chickpea flour and potato starch instead of eggs. The latkes are fried in batches in an oiled pan. The thickness is a matter of personal preference.

Puréed potato version
The dough for puréed potato latkes is puréed in a food processor. This form of latke is easier to shape and has a "pudding-like consistency".

Other variations
Before the potato, latkes were and in some places still are, made from a variety of other vegetables, cheeses, legumes, or starches. Modern recipes often call for the addition of onions and carrots. Other versions include zucchini, sweet onion, gruyere (for french onion flavor), and sweet potatoes. Sephardi Jews make latkes with zucchini and garlic (mücver), omitting dairy-based toppings (yogurt) when served as a side for roasts or meat.

See also
Ijjeh, egg dish sometimes cooked like latkes

References

Ashkenazi Jewish cuisine
Hanukkah foods
Potato pancakes
Yiddish words and phrases